Lippia is a genus of flowering plants in the verbena family, Verbenaceae. It was named after Augustus Lippi,  (1678-1705), a French naturalist and botanist (with Italian origins). He was killed in Abyssinia. The genus contains roughly 200 species of tropical shrubs that are found around the world. Plants are fragrant due to their essential oils, which vary between species but may include estragole, carvacrol, linalool, or limonene. The leaves of certain species, such as L. graveolens, can be used as a culinary herb similar to oregano.

Selected species
 Lippia abyssinica (Otto & A.Dietr.) Cufod. – Koseret; (Ethiopia)
 Lippia alba (Mill.) N.E.Br. ex Britton & P.Wilson – Bushy lippia, white lippia (Texas in the United States, Mexico, the Caribbean, Central America, and South America)
 Lippia carterae (Moldenke) G.L.Nesom – Licorice verbena (Baja California, Mexico)
 Lippia durangensis Moldenke
 Lippia graveolens Kunth – Mexican oregano, scented lippia, scented matgrass (Southwestern United States, Mexico, and Central America as far south as Nicaragua)
 Lippia javanica (Burm.f.) Spreng.
 Lippia kituiensis Vatke
 Lippia micromera Schauer – Spanish thyme (Central America, the Caribbean, and northern South America)
 Lippia multiflora Moldenke
 Lippia myriocephala Schltdl. & Cham.
 Lippia palmeri S.Watson
 Lippia pretoriensis H.Pearson
 Lippia rehmannii H.Pearson
 Lippia salicifolia Andersson (Ecuador)
 Lippia scaberrima Sond.
 Lippia sidoides Cham.
 Lippia substrigosa Turcz.
 Lippia thymoides Mart. & Schauer

Formerly placed here
 Aloysia citrodora Palau (as L. citrodora Kunth or L. triphylla (L'Hér.) Kuntze)
 Aloysia lycioides Cham. (as L. lycioides (Cham.) Steud.)
 Aloysia scorodonioides (Kunth) Cham. (as L. scorodonioides Kunth or L. wrightii A.Gray ex Torr.)
 Lantana montevidensis (Spreng.) Briq. (as L. montevidensis Spreng.)
 Lantana ukambensis (Vatke) Verdc. (as L. ukambensis Vatke)
 Mulguraea ligustrina (Lag.) N.O'Leary & P.Peralta (as L. ligustrina (Lag.) Britton)
 Phyla canescens (Kunth) Greene (as L. canescens Kunth or L. filiformis Schrad.)
 Phyla cuneifolia (Torr.) Greene (as L. cuneifolia (Torr.) Steud.)
 Phyla dulcis (Trevir.) Moldenke (as L.  dulcis Trevir.)
 Phyla lanceolata (Michx.) Greene  (as L. lanceolata Michx.)
 Phyla nodiflora (L.) Greene (as L. nodiflora (L.) Michx. or L. repens Spreng.)
 Phyla stoechadifolia (L.) Small (as L. stoechadifolia (L.) Kunth)

References

 
Verbenaceae genera
Herbs